Ahmed Sinan (born 19 March 1990) is a Maldivian director, graphic designer, cinematographer and editor.

Career
Ahmed Sinan made his career debut with Dark Rain Entertainment's production, Happy Birthday (2009) by working as the title animator and creating visual effects. He was then offered to make title animations and visual effects for films produced under several studios.

Sinan's most recognized work came in 2013, Ali Shifau-directed horror film Fathis Handhuvaruge Feshun 3D which serves as a prequel to Fathis Handhuvaru (1997) starring Reeko Moosa Manik and Niuma Mohamed in lead roles. The film was marketed as being the first 3D release for a Maldivian film and the first release derived from spin-off. Using a single laptop and working on a daily basis all by himself, the project took him two months to be completed. Upon release, the film received generally negative reviews from critics though its visual effects were particularly praised. Ahmed Nadheem from Haveeru Daily called the film a visual treat and wrote: "Fathis Handhuvaruge Feshun is a cinematic revelation in terms of graphic animations. The film has no repeat value but it deserves multiple watch solely due to its VFX". At the 7th Gaumee Film Awards Sinan earned his first Gaumee Film Award for Best Visual Effects.

In 2016, Sinan occupied the director's seat alongside Fathimath Nahula for the horror film 4426. Upon release, the film received mostly positive reviews from critics. Ahmed Nadheem of Avas labelled the film as a "masterpiece" and praised Nahula's expertise in direction with Sinan's infused "technical quality" in the film. "At a point it became obvious that Sinan was roped in for the film to uplift the standard in its technical department". Ahmed Adhushan reviewing for Mihaaru praised his work in the film. "The technical department has raised the bar in the film. From the crisp and sharp editing to its direction, Sinan needs to be applauded for his commitment".  4426 was declared as the highest-grossing Maldivian film of the year. At the 8th Gaumee Film Awards, Sinan received his second Gaumee Film Award for Best Visual Effects while being nominated in the same category for his work in the films; Mikoe Bappa Baey Baey, Hulhudhaan and Vaashey Mashaa Ekee. He also received three nominations for Best Cinematography, all shared with Ali Shifau and a Gaumee Film Award nomination for Best Editing for the film Hulhudhaan.

Filmography

Feature film

Visual effect

 Happy Birthday (2009)
 Dhin Veynuge Hithaamaigaa (2010)
 Zaharu (2011)
 Fathis Handhuvaruge Feshun 3D (2013)
 Ingili (2013)
  Dhilakani (2013)
 Hulhudhaan (2014)
 Emme Fahu Vindha Jehendhen (2015) 
 Mikoe Bappa Baey Baey (2015)
 Vaashey Mashaa Ekee (2016)
 4426 (2016) 
 Mee Loaybakee (2017) 
 Vakin Loabin (2018) 
 Goh Raalhu (2019)
 Maamui  (2019)

Accolades

References

External links

Living people
People from Malé
1990 births
Maldivian film directors